Melampyrum nemorosum is an herbaceous flowering plant in the family Orobanchaceae. It is native to Europe. In Sweden it is called natt och dag. (Night and Day) In Russia it is called Ivan-da-Marya. (Ivan and Maria) a Christianisation of the traditional Slavic Kupalo-da-Mavka (Kupalo-and-Mavka). 

This is an annual plant. The new leaves are blue, turning green as they mature. They are usually toothed at the bases.

This plant is a host to the rust fungus Coleosporium melampyri  und Cronartium flaccidum with the associated uredium and telium.

References

External links

Orobanchaceae
Flora of Europe
Plants described in 1753
Taxa named by Carl Linnaeus